Sekhar (born 7 November 1980) is an Indian dance choreographer who predominantly works in Telugu cinema.

Early life

Sekhar was born on 7 November 1980 in Vijayawada, Andhra Pradesh. He studied in Vijayawada until intermediate, and moved to Hyderabad in 1996. He met fight master Sambasiva Rao though his uncle, who liked his dance and advised him to pursue a career in films. He got his membership card as a background dancer in 1996. He was a student of a choreographer. He worked as a background dancer for six years and an assistant for eight years before becoming a movie choreographer.

Sekhar is married to Sujata, and the couple has two children.

Filmography

As choreographer

TV shows and appearances

Awards and nominations

References

External links
 

Indian film choreographers
Living people
Dancers from Andhra Pradesh
Indian choreographers
Filmfare Awards South winners
Indian male dancers
1979 births
South Indian International Movie Awards winners
Santosham Film Awards winners
|}